Artyom Valeryevich Fomin (born 8 July 1988) is a former Russian professional footballer.

Club career
He made his professional debut in the Russian First Division in 2008 for FC Dynamo Barnaul.

References

External links
 

1988 births
People from Biysk
Living people
Russian footballers
Association football forwards
FC Dynamo Barnaul players
Kazakhstan Premier League players
FC Kairat players
FC Atyrau players
Expatriate footballers in Kazakhstan
Russian expatriate sportspeople in Kazakhstan
FC Spartak Moscow players
Sportspeople from Altai Krai